Lluxita Punta (Aymara lluxi shell of a mussel; landslide, also spelled Llojeta Punta) is a  mountain in the Bolivian Andes. It is located in the La Paz Department, Aroma Province, Sica Sica Municipality. Lluxita Punta lies southwest of Janq'u Uta and southeast of Llallawa.

References 

Mountains of La Paz Department (Bolivia)